Little Christmas, also known as Old Christmas, Green Christmas, or Twelfth Night, is one of the traditional names among Irish Christians and Amish Christians for 6 January, which is also known more widely as the Feast of the Epiphany, celebrated after the conclusion of the twelve days of Christmastide. It is the traditional end of the Christmas season and until 2013 was the last day of the Christmas holidays for both primary and secondary schools in Ireland.

Origins
Owing to differences in liturgical calendars, as early as the fourth century, the churches of the eastern Roman Empire were celebrating Christmas on 6 January, while those of the western Roman Empire were celebrating it on 25 December.

In October 1582, Pope Gregory XIII introduced the Gregorian calendar as a correction of the Julian calendar, because the latter has too many leap years that cause it to drift out of alignment with the solar year. This has liturgical significance since calculation of the date of Easter assumes that spring Equinox in the Northern Hemisphere occurs on 21 March. To correct the accumulated error, he ordained the date be advanced by ten days. Most Roman Catholic countries adopted the new calendar immediately and Protestant countries followed suit over the following 200 years. In particular, the British Empire (including the American colonies) did so from 1752 with the Calendar (New Style) Act 1750, by which time the divergence had grown to eleven days. This meant that Christmas Day on 25 December ('New Style') was eleven days earlier than it would have been but for the Act, making "Old Christmas" [25 December ('Old Style')] happen on 5 January (NS). In February 1800, the Julian calendar had another leap year but the Gregorian did not, moving Old Christmas to 6 January (NS), which coincided with the Feast of the Epiphany.

For this reason, in some parts of the world, the Feast of the Epiphany, which is traditionally observed on 6 January, is sometimes referred to as Old Christmas or Old Christmas Day. (Although 1900 was also not a leap year in the Gregorian calendar (and thus the Julian 25 December has since that year coincided with 7January in the Gregorian calendar) the custom of celebrating Little Christmas on 6January did not change.)

Observance by country

Europe
The Transalpine Redemptorists who live on Papa Stronsay in Scotland, celebrate 'Little Christmas' on the twenty-fifth day of every month, except for December, when the twenty-fifth day is celebrated as Christmas Day. The custom of blessing homes on Epiphany developed because the feast commemorates the time that the three kings visited the home of the Holy Family.

In the late 19th Century, the day was also known as Little Christmas in some parts of England, such as Lancashire. In the Isle of Man, New Year's Day on 1 January was formerly called  in Manx, or Little Christmas Day, while 6 January was referred to as Old Christmas Day. The name Little Christmas is also found in other languages including Slovene, Galician, and Ukrainian.

In Scandinavia, where the main celebration of Christmas is on Christmas Eve, the evening of 23 December is known as little Christmas Eve.

In some parts of the Spanish-speaking world, the emphasis of Christmas Day is on family dinner reunion and church attendance, while gifts are exchanged on the Feast of the Epiphany, when according to tradition the Three Wise Men (or Magi) brought gifts of gold, frankincense and myrrh to the Child Jesus. Tradition names them Melchior, Caspar and Balthazar. It is an important celebration in Spanish-speaking countries, mainly dedicated to children, who receive their gifts on the morning of 6 January. In some countries, like Spain, it is a public holiday that marks the end of the Christmas season which started on Christmas Eve (24 December).

In the Western Christian world, the two traditional days when Christmas decorations are removed are Twelfth Night (the night before the Feast of the Epiphany) and if they are not taken down on that day, Candlemas, the latter of which ends the Christmas-Epiphany season in some denominations.

North America
Some Anabaptists, such as the Amish and Mennonites, celebrate Christmas as a religious feast-day on 6 January.

Celebration of Christmas Day on 6 January is reflected in the words of Cherry-Tree Carol, an English folk-song that migrated to Appalachia in the Eastern United States. In his paper The Observance of Old Christmas in Southern Appalachia, CRYoung writes 'sometime before the twentieth century, singers who may have been Appalachian residents turned the question which Mary asks of Jesus in regard to "what this world will be" into a query which Joseph puts to the unborn baby. Taking "Mary all on his left knee," he inquires when the birthday will be. Jesus responds:'

Young reports that "Bill 'Kitchen' Isom, an advocate of Old Christmas whose rendering of this carol Jean Thomas recorded in Carter County, Kentucky, gave the 'wind up of it' in these words:
The holiday was also recognized by certain Ozark communities, "In some sections of Arkansas there are people who bury the entrails of a black hen under the hearth on "Old Christmas." This is said to protect the house against destruction by lightning or fire. [...] I know that some "peckerwood families" did bury chicken guts under their hearths as recently as 1935, not far from the enlightened metropolis of Hot Springs."

Women's Christmas
In Ireland, Little Christmas is also called Women's Christmas, and sometimes Women's Little Christmas. The tradition, still strong in Cork and Kerry, is so called because Irish men take on household duties for the day. Goose was the traditional meat served on Women's Christmas. Some women hold parties or go out on 6 January with their friends, sisters, mothers and aunts. As a result, parties of women and girls are common in bars and restaurants on this night.

In Ireland, it is the traditional day to remove the Christmas tree and decorations. The tradition is not well documented, but one article from The Irish Times (January 1998), entitled "On the woman's day of Christmas," describes both some sources of information and the spirit of this occasion.

Other meanings
A "Little Christmas" is also a figure in Irish set dancing. It refers to a figure where half the set, four dancers, join together with hands linked behind partners lower back, and the whole figure proceeds to rotate in a clockwise motion, usually for eight bars.
In the dance concerned, female participants enacted the traditional celebration's house visits and slightly subversive tone by taking the active "male" role of switching from partner to partner.

See also 

 Chalking the door

Notes

References

Notes

Sources

External links
 Article from the James Joyce Quarterly on references to Women's Christmas in the work of James Joyce (Mary Burke)

Amish
Christmas in Ireland
Christmas in Scotland
Epiphany (holiday)
January observances
Christmas in England
Christmas in the United Kingdom